Across the Plains is a 1910 American silent Western film directed by Francis Boggs and starring Hobart Bosworth.

Cast
 Hobart Bosworth
 Betty Harte 
 Tom Santschi

External links 
 

1910 films
1910 Western (genre) films
American black-and-white films
American silent short films
Selig Polyscope Company films
Silent American Western (genre) films
1910s American films
1910s English-language films